Umayyah Juha or Omaya Joha (Arabic: أمية جحا ) is a Palestinian artist and political cartoonist. She was born in Gaza City on 2 February 1972. She won the Arab Journalism Award for the year 2001. She is the first female cartoonist in the Arab world working in daily political newspapers and news sites, and she is a painter on Aljazeera.com – the most famous Arabic news site – And it has a special page on the site. She is also the recipient of the Arab Journalism Award in the United Arab Emirates in 2001. She is the wife of two martyrs.
She graduated from the mathematics department of Al-Azhar University in 1995 with honors at the university.

1st female cartoonist in the Arab world work in daily political newspapers 
Umayya is the first cartoonist in Palestine and the Arab world to work for a daily political newspaper.

Jobs 
 She worked as a mathematics teacher for three years, then resigned in 1999 to devote herself to technical work.
 She worked for the daily newspaper Alquds since September 1999.
 She is a member of the Naji Al-Ali Association of Fine Arts in Palestine.
 She works in other daily political newspapers and news websites, as well as chaired the cartoon company, Juha Ton.
 She participated in many local exhibitions.

Awards 
She won many Awards such as:
 The Palestinian Ministry of Culture Award for Cartoons, 1999.
 Arab Journalism Award, 2002.
 The creative women Award for Cartoons, 2007.
 The grand prize of "Naji Al Ali Award for Cartoon", 2010.

Facebook deleted her page
On 11 January 2016 Facebook deleted her official page and all her cartoons.

See also 
 Carlos Latuff

References

External links
 Omaya Joha on Facebook

1972 births
Palestinian Muslims
Palestinian women artists
Palestinian painters
Palestinian caricaturists
Palestinian Muslim Brotherhood members
People from Gaza City
Living people
Muslim Brotherhood women
Palestinian activists
Palestinian Muslim activists
Palestinian human rights activists